Mount Scott may refer to:

Antarctica
Mount Scott (Antarctica), a horseshoe-shaped massif on the Kiev Peninsula

Canada
Mount Scott (Canada), a mountain on the Continental Divide on the British Columbia-Alberta border

United States
Mount Scott (Oklahoma), a mountain in the Wichita Mountains of southwestern Oklahoma
Mount Scott (Clackamas County, Oregon), a minor volcano in the Portland, Oregon metropolitan area
Mount Scott (Klamath County, Oregon), a stratovolcano in Crater Lake National Park in southern Oregon
 Mount Scott (Washington), a mountain summit in Olympic National Park